Oscar Parish is a parish in Östermalm's church district (kontrakt) in the Diocese of Stockholm, Sweden. The parish is located in Stockholm Municipality in Stockholm County. The parish forms its own pastorship.

History
Oscar Parish was formed on 1 May 1906 by a break from Hedvig Eleonora Parish and has since formed its own pastorship. The name was Oskar until 1962 when it was changed to Oscar. There are five churches in Oscar Parish:; Oscar's Church, Gustaf Adolf Church, Djurgårdskyrkan, Olaus Petri Church and Oscars Lillkyrka. Since 2002, the Oscar Parish has had a well-developed exchange of friends with Martin Luther Kirchengemeinde in Zeuthen, Berlin, Germany.

Location
Oscar Parish includes parts of Östermalm, Gärdet, Frihamnen and southern Djurgården.

References

Further reading

External links
 

Parishes of the Church of Sweden
Diocese of Stockholm (Church of Sweden)